Alexandra Romanova may refer to:

 Alexandra Fedorovna of Prussia (1798–1860), empress consort of Nicholas I of Russia
 Alexandra Fedorovna of Hesse (1872–1918), empress consort of Nicholas II of Russia
 Alexandra Iosifovna (1830–1911), wife of Grand Duke Konstantin Nikolayevich of Russia
 Alexandra Petrovna of Oldenburg (1838–1900), wife of Grand Duke Nicholas Nicolayevich of Russia
 Alexandra Georgievna of Greece (1870–1891), daughter of George I of Greece, wife of Grand Duke Paul Alexandrovich of Russia
 Grand Duchess Alexandra Pavlovna of Russia (1783–1801), daughter of Emperor Paul I of Russia
 Grand Duchess Alexandra Nikolaevna of Russia (1825–1844), daughter of Emperor Nicholas I, first wife of Frederick, Landgrave of Hesse
 Grand Duchess Alexandra Alexandrovna of Russia (1842–1849), eldest child of Emperor Alexander II of Russia